Earle Buckingham (1887-1978) was an American mechanical engineer and pioneer in the theory of gears.

Buckingham was one of the founders of the theory of gearing and gear design and made significant contributions to this area. His monographs gained him international recognition in addition to the great respect he had already earned in English-speaking countries.

Buckingham was born in 1887 in Bridgeport, Connecticut. He attended the United States Naval Academy in Annapolis, Maryland from 1904 to 1906 and then began to work in industry. In 1919, he directed his research and science interests to the field of gears, initially as a gear consultant for the Niles-Bement-Pond Company (now Pratt & Whitney) and then from 1925 to 1954 as a professor of mechanical engineering at the Massachusetts Institute of Technology in Cambridge, Massachusetts. After retirement, he continued his research activity as a gear consultant.

Buckingham’s books (e.g., Analytical Mechanics of Gears, 1963) laid the foundation for the theory of gearing and became references for at least two generations of engineers and researchers. The engineering community recognized his contributions to the design and theory of gears by presenting him these prestigious awards: the American Society of Mechanical Engineers (ASME) Worcester Reed Warner Medal, 1944; the American Gear Manufacturers Association (AGMA) Edward P. Connel Award, 1950; the American Society of Test Engineers (ASTE) Gold Medal, 1957; the Gold Medal of the British Gear Manufacturers Association, 1962; and the Golden Gear Award of Power Transmission Design magazine in commemoration of the AGMA 50th Anniversary. Also in recognition of his contributions, Buckingham lectures are delivered at the USA Power Transmission and Gearing conferences.

Development of gear Technology and Theroy of Gearing.

Faydo L. Litvin. Nasa Reference Publication 1406. ARL-TR-1500

Awards
 American Society of Mechanical Engineers (ASME) Worcester Reed Warner Medal, 1944
 American Gear Manufacturers Association (AGMA) Edward P. Connel Award, 1950
 American Society of Test Engineers (ASTE) Gold Medal, 1957
 Gold Medal of the British Gear Manufacturers Association, 1962
 Golden Gear Award of Power Transmission Design magazine in commemoration of the AGMA 50th Anniversary.

Selected publications
 Involute spur gears. Niles-Bement-Pond Co., New York, c.1922.
 Spur gears: Design, operation, and production. McGraw-Hill, New York, 1928.
 Dynamic loads on gear teeth. American society of Mechanical Engineers, New York, 1931.
 Dimensions and tolerances for mass production. Industrial Press, New York, 1954.
 Design of worm and spiral gears: A manual for the design and manufacture of all-recess-action worm and spiral gear drives. Industrial Press, New York, c.1960. (With Henry H. Ryffel)
 Analytical Mechanics of Gears. 1963.

References 

1887 births
1978 deaths
MIT School of Engineering faculty
American mechanical engineers
Gears
People from Bridgeport, Connecticut
United States Naval Academy alumni